Mallows Bay is a small bay on the Maryland side of the Potomac River in Charles County, Maryland, United States. The bay is the location of what is regarded as the "largest shipwreck fleet in the Western Hemisphere" and is described as a "ship graveyard."

Mallows Bay was declared a National Marine Sanctuary in July 2019.

Ghost fleet
The "Ghost Fleet" of Mallows Bay is a reference to the hundreds of ships whose remains still rest in its relatively shallow waters. In total, 230 United States Shipping Board Merchant Fleet Corporation ships sunk in the river. More than 100 of the vessels are wooden steamships, part of a fleet built to cross the Atlantic during World War I. Because they were built of wood due to a lack of available steel, most of these ships were obsolete upon completion after the end of the war.  

The U.S. Navy did not want the ships, which were stored in the James River – at the cost of $50,000 a month – so they were sold to the Western Marine & Salvage Company. The company moved the ships to the Potomac River at Widewater, Virginia and in 1925, they were towed to Mallows Bay.  Western Marine went bankrupt and the ships were burned and remained where they lay. During World War II, Bethlehem Steel built a salvage basin to recover metal from the abandoned ships.  Wrecks of various civilian boats are also present at the site.

Access to the ships is through Mallows Bay Park, operated by the county, located at 1440 Wilson Landing Road in Nanjemoy, Maryland. A  trail loops around the park and the salvage basin. In 2010, a boat ramp and pier for recreational use was constructed to provide access to the Potomac River. It is popular to canoe or kayak among the ship ruins; the ships form a reef that hosts an array of wildlife.

The bay was listed as an archaeological and historic district on the National Register of Historic Places in 2015, and was declared a National Marine Sanctuary in July 2019.

Among the most prominent ships seen at Mallows Bay is the S.S. Accomac.

Gallery

See also
National Register of Historic Places listings in Charles County, Maryland

References
Notes

Further reading
Shomette, Donald (1996) Ghost Fleet of Mallows Bay and Other Tales of the Lost Chesapeake. Centreville, Maryland: Tidewater Publishers. . .

External links

Mallows Bay Park, 1440 Wilson Landing Road, Nanjemoy, MD 20662
, at Maryland Historical Trust
Mallows Bay - Potomac River: A Proposed National Marine Sanctuary. NOAA Office of National Marine Sanctuaries
NOAA. National System of Marine Protected Areas (MPAs) 
Ghost Fleet Fast Facts. Oct 31, 2017. National Marine Sanctuary Foundation
Friends of Mallows Potomac National Marine Sanctuary in Nanjemoy, Maryland
Friends of Mallows Potomac National Marine Sanctuary Facebook page
Mallows Bay - Potomac River: A Proposed National Marine Sanctuary. Chesapeake Conservancy
The Nature Conservancy -  Passport to Nature: Ghost Fleet of Mallows Bay
The National Trust for Historic Preservation. National Treasures. Ghost Fleet of the Potomac. Location: Charles County, Maryland
'The Ghosts of These Historic Ships Float On'. Named a National Treasure. The National Trust for Historic Preservation. Preservation Magazine, Winter 2018
NOAA Nautical Chart 12288 - Potomac River

Aerial imagery of Mallows Bay from The National Map
Mallows Bay Ghost Fleet along the Potomac River - from fossilguy
'Secrets of the Chesapeake'. Maryland Public TV (MPT) Specials. PBS. 56:50
PBS 'Secrets of the Chesapeake': Mallows Bay WWI shipwrecks. Broadcast April 18, 2012. Includes Photos Mallows Bay 1 & 2. 

Bays of Maryland
Bodies of water of Charles County, Maryland
Potomac River
Archaeological sites on the National Register of Historic Places in Maryland
Historic districts on the National Register of Historic Places in Maryland
Shipwrecks in the Chesapeake Bay
National Register of Historic Places in Charles County, Maryland
Ship graveyards
United States in World War I
United States in World War II
Modern ruins
Protected areas established in 2019
2019 establishments in Maryland
National Marine Sanctuaries of the United States